Siwash Creek is a creek which is located in the Similkameen region of British Columbia. Siwash Creek has been mined for gold. The word is considered by some to be derisive, but remains in use in certain place names and other contexts without derogatory associations such as Siwash sweater. Nashwito Creek has also been referred to as Siwash Creek.

References

Rivers of British Columbia